General Bakht Khan (1797–1859) was the commander-in-chief of the Indian rebel forces in the city of Delhi during the Indian Rebellion of 1857 against the East India Company.

Life story
Urdu writers describe General Bakht Khan as being of Rohilla heritage on his father's side while his mother was an Awadhi princess, but do not give clear details of his antecedents. Frederic Cooper, who participated in the suppression of the Mutiny, cites Bakht Khan's late commanding officer, Waddy, that he was an Indian Muslim belonging to a family of convert origin. According to the British spy, Munshi Jiwan, Bakht Khan had on an occasion told the Emperor that he belonged to the royal family of Awadh and requested an enquiry to confirm it. He was born at Bijnor in Rohilkhand and later became a subedar, the chief native commanding officer, in the army of the East India Company, gaining forty years of experience in the Bengal horse artillery and seeing action in the First Anglo-Afghan War. In the British Indian artillery, North Indian MusIims were generaIIy preferred and made the majority of the establishment. 

Before the rebellion Subedar Bakht Khan was well known to a number of British officers, including several who were to serve against him during the siege of Delhi in 1857. One colonel described him as being "a most intelligent character".

The revolt

Indian Rebellion of 1857 started when a group of sepoys rebelled against the introduction of rifle cartridges that were allegedly greased with pig or beef fat. This offended both Muslim soldiers, who did not eat pork and Hindu soldiers, who did not eat beef. The uprising spread rapidly in the surrounding areas of Delhi against the British.

With the outbreak of the mutiny in Bareilly, Subhedar Bahadur Khan had been acclaimed as general by the sepoys involved. When Bakht Khan heard of the rebellion in Meerut, he decided to march to Delhi to support the Mughal emperor Bahadur Shah Zafar's army. 
By the time Bakht Khan arrived at Delhi on 1 July 1857, with a large number of Rohilla sepoys, the city had already been taken by rebel forces and the Mughal ruler Bahadur Shah Zafar had been proclaimed Emperor of India. The Bareilly Brigade led by Bakht Khan included four regiments of Bengal Native Infantry, one of cavalry and a battery of artillery. The appearance of this substantial reinforcement, marching in good order, dismayed the British besieging Delhi and impressed Bahadur Shah Zafar. Bakht and his officers were quickly summoned to meet with the emperor.

The emperor's eldest son, Mirza Mughal, also called Mirza Zahiruddin, had been given the title of chief general, but this prince had no military experience. This was the moment when Bakht Khan along with his forces arrived in Delhi. With his arrival, the leadership position did improve. Bakht Khan's administrative abilities quickly became evident, and the emperor gave him actual authority and the title of Saheb-e-Alam Bahadur, or Lord Governor General. Khan was virtual commander of the sepoy forces, although Mirza Zahiruudin was still the commander-in-chief.

Bakht Khan faced many problems which needed his immediate attention. The first and foremost problem was financial, to solve it he obtained from the Emperor authority to collect taxes. The second problem was the logistical one of supplies, which became more and more acute with the passage of time and even more so when British forces assaulted the city in September 1857. The British had many spies and agents in the city and were constantly pressuring Bahadur Shah to surrender. The situation around Delhi proceeded to deteriorate rapidly; Bakht Khan's leadership could not compensate for the rebels' lack of organization, supplies and military strength. Delhi was besieged by the British on 8 June 1857. On 14 September, the British captured the Kashmiri Gate and Bahadur Shah fled to Humayun's Tomb before surrendering to the British (against Bakht Khan's pleas) on 20 September. The emperor was arrested, and his sons Mirza Abu Bakr and Mirza Khizr Sultan were executed by the British. In the aftermath of the city's capture, the victorious troops sacked the city for several days before order was eventually restored.

Bakht Khan himself left Delhi and joined rebel forces in Lucknow and Shahjahanpur. Later, Bahadur Shah Zafar was tried on the charges of treason and exiled to Rangoon in Burma where he died in 1862.

Death
After being forced out of Delhi, he was mortally wounded by the British in the last days of the mutiny and died in the Terai plains of Nepal in 1859, where he is said to have entered along with Begum Hazrat Mahal in 1858/1859 after Awadh came under British control.

An unnamed tomb in the graveyard of Nanser village in Buner district of Khyber Pakhtunkhwa in Pakistan has been apocryphally claimed by local historians to be that of Khan, who claim that he came to the region after the war was lost and spent the rest of his life under the protection of Akhund of Swat.

References

Further reading
 
 T. Rice Holmes. A History of the Indian Mutiny. London. 1898.

1797 births
1859 deaths
People of the First Anglo-Afghan War
Revolutionaries of the Indian Rebellion of 1857
Indian people of Pashtun descent
People from Bijnor
19th-century Indian Muslims
Pashtun people
Indian independence activists from Uttar Pradesh
People from Bijnor district